Alex Bobidosh (September 9, 1890 – September 11, 1981) was a professional football player. He played in one game in the National Football League during the 1922 season with the Oorang Indians. The Indians were a team based in LaRue, Ohio, composed only of Native Americans, and coached by Jim Thorpe.

References

1890 births
1981 deaths
American football ends
Native American players of American football
Oorang Indians players
People from Lac du Flambeau, Wisconsin
Players of American football from Wisconsin